Disneyland is a theme park,  conceived by Walt Disney, within the Disneyland Resort in Anaheim, California. As of January 2023, Disneyland has 53 attractions with 50 rides (The term "attractions" is used by Disney as a catch-all term for rides, shows, and exhibits.)

Below is an incomplete list of the current attractions found in Disneyland, arranged by "land". These are only attractions from the Disneyland Park itself, not from Disney California Adventure Park, or other parts of the Disneyland Resort. Character meets are not listed in this article.

Main Street, U.S.A.

 Disneyland Railroad
 Great Moments with Mr. Lincoln
 The Disney Gallery
 Main Street Vehicles
 Main Street Cinema

Adventureland

 Walt Disney's Enchanted Tiki Room
 Jungle Cruise
 Indiana Jones Adventure: Temple of the Forbidden Eye

Future attractions
 Adventureland Treehouse (opening in 2023)

New Orleans Square

 Pirates of the Caribbean
 The Haunted Mansion
 Disneyland Railroad

Future attractions
 Tiana's Bayou Adventure (opening in 2024)

Critter Country

 Davy Crockett Explorer Canoes
 The Many Adventures of Winnie the Pooh
 Splash Mountain

Frontierland

 Big Thunder Mountain Railroad 
 Mark Twain Riverboat
 Frontierland Shootin' Exposition
 Pirate's Lair on Tom Sawyer Island
 Sailing Ship Columbia

Mickey's Toontown

 Mickey & Minnie's Runaway Railway
 Disneyland Railroad
 Mickey's House and Meet Mickey
 Minnie's House 
 Roger Rabbit's Car Toon Spin 
 Chip 'n' Dale's Gadget Coaster 
 CenTOONial Park
 Donald's Duck Pond
 Goofy's How-To-Play Yard

Fantasyland

 Fantasyland Theatre 
 It's a Small World
 Mr. Toad's Wild Ride
 Peter Pan's Flight
 Pinocchio's Daring Journey
 Pixie Hollow
 Snow White's Enchanted Wish
 Storybook Land Canal Boats
 Dumbo the Flying Elephant
 Casey Jr. Circus Train
 Alice in Wonderland
 Matterhorn Bobsleds
 King Arthur Carrousel
 Mad Tea Party
 Sleeping Beauty Castle Walkthrough

Tomorrowland

Astro Orbiter
Autopia 
Star Tours – The Adventures Continue
Buzz Lightyear Astro Blasters
Space Mountain
Disneyland Monorail
Disneyland Railroad
Finding Nemo Submarine Voyage
Star Wars Launch Bay

Star Wars: Galaxy's Edge

Millennium Falcon: Smuggler's Run
Star Wars: Rise of the Resistance

Entertainment

Parades
Magic Happens (2020; 2023-present)

Former Parades
 Main Street Electrical Parade (1972-1996, 2017, 2019, 2022)
 Light Magic (1997)
Paint the Night (2015-2017)

Fireworks
 Fantasmic!
 Believe... In Holiday Magic
 Disney's Celebrate America (Every 4th of July)
 Halloween Screams
 Fantasy in the Sky: Special New Year's Eve Countdown (every December 31)
 Wondrous Journeys

Former Fireworks
 Disneyland Forever
 Mickey's Mix Magic

References

External links
 Disneyland official Website

Disneyland